La Petite Bande is a Belgium-based ensemble specialising in music of the Baroque and Classical eras played on period instruments. They are particularly known for their recordings of works by Corelli, Rameau, Handel, Bach, Haydn, and Mozart.

History 

The ensemble was brought together in 1972 by Sigiswald Kuijken, originally for the one-off purpose of recording Lully's comédie-ballet, Le Bourgeois gentilhomme, conducted by Gustav Leonhardt for the Deutsche Harmonia Mundi label. The ensemble was given its name from Lully's Petite Bande des Violons du Roi, an orchestra of 21 string players at the court of Louis XIV. The nucleus of the original group was the Leonhardt Consort along with Sigiswald Kuijken and his brothers Wieland and Barthold. Following the recording, the group continued to give concerts throughout Europe and became a permanent ensemble based in Leuven with Kuijken as director. Their initial repertoire concentrated on French Baroque music, but soon branched out into Italian and German composers, including Corelli, Handel and Bach. They also branched out from the Baroque to the Classical period with performances and recordings of works by Haydn and Mozart. The ensemble's 1982 recording of Haydn's The Creation was the first time the work had been recorded using period instruments. Their UK debut was at the 1982 BBC Proms, with a concert of pieces by Bach, Handel, and Rameau. The critic Barry Millington described the performance in The Musical Times:

La Petite Bande's recordings of operatic rarities during their first ten years include Rameau's Zoroastre, Zaïs, and Pigmalion as well as Campra's L'Europe galante and Grétry's Le jugement de Midas. From 2006 to 2012, the ensemble has largely concentrated on Bach, especially his cantatas with the goal of recording a complete liturgical year, but also his St John Passion, St Matthew Passion and Mass in B minor. Singers in these projects, each part sung by one singer, have included sopranos Gerlinde Sämann, Barbara Schlick, Elisabeth Scholl and Siri Thornhill, altos René Jacobs and Petra Noskaiová, tenors Christoph Genz, Christoph Prégardien and Marcus Ullmann, and basses Jan van der Crabben, Max van Egmond and Harry van der Kamp.

On 2 February 2009, Sigiswald Kuijken was awarded the Prize for Cultural Merit by the Belgian government. The following day, the advisory committee of the Ministry of Culture recommended that La Petite Bande's 600,000 euro annual subsidy be removed. Kuijken's students started an internet petition to save the subsidy which received 21,000 signatures. The Minister of Culture at the time, Bert Anciaux, ignored the advice of the committee and restored the subsidy until 2012 (reduced to 590,000 euro). The ensemble has since started a charitable foundation, Support La Petite Bande, to make up the shortfall.  Some funding was subsequently granted for 2013 to 2016.

In 2011, Kuijken decided to leave the future direction of the ensemble to younger musicians and chose the organist Benjamin Alard to direct a new Handel project which began in April 2013.

Discography 
 1973 – J. Lully – Le Bourgeois Gentilhomme – DHM
 1974 – A. Campra – L'Europe Galante (extracts) – DHM
 1975 – G. Muffat – Suites en Concerti Grossi – DHM
 1977 – A. Corelli – Concerti Grossi Op. 6, nrs. 1–4 – DHM
 1978 – A. Corelli – Concerti Grossi Op. 6, nrs. 6–12 – DHM
 1978 – J.-P. Rameau – Zaïs – WDR/Stil
 1979 – J.-P. Rameau – Suite from Hippolyte et Aricie – DHM
 1980 – A. Vivaldi – Quattro Stagioni – RCA/Seon
 1980 – G. F. Handel – Partenope – WDR/DHM
 1981 – A. E. M. Grétry – Le Jugement de Midas (extracts) – WDR/Ricercar
 1981 – J.-P. Rameau – Pygmalion – WDR/DHM
 1982 – J. S. Bach – Orchestral Suites (Overtures) BWV 1066–1069 – WDR/DHM
 1982 – J. S. Bach – Violinkonzerte BWV 1041–1043 – WDR/DHM
 1982 – C.W. Gluck – Orfeo ed Euridice
 1983 – J. Haydn – Die Schöpfung
 1984 – J.-P. Rameau – Zoroastre – WDR/DHM
 1985 – G. F. Handel – Alessandro – WDR/DHM
 1986 – J. S. Bach – Mass in B minor – WDR/DHM
 1986 – W. A. Mozart – Davide penitente K. 469 / Ave Verum Corpus K. 618 – WDR/DHM
 1987 – C. P. E. Bach – Die Letzten Leiden des Erlösers – WDR/DHM
 1987 – W. A. Mozart – Requiem (Live recording)
 1987 – W. A. Mozart – Flute Concertos – WDR/DHM
 1988 – J. Haydn – L'Infedelta Delusa – WDR/DHM
 1988 – J. S. Bach – St John Passion BWV 245 – WDR/DHM
 1988 – W. A. Mozart – Concert arias – Virgin Classics
 1989 – J. Haydn – Symphonies 25, 52, 53 – Virgin Classics
 1989 – J. Haydn – Symphonies 90, 91 – Virgin Classics
 1989 – J. S. Bach – Magnificat – Virgin Classics
 1990 – J. Haydn – Die Jahreszeiten – Virgin Classics
 1990 – J. S. Bach – St Matthew Passion – BMG/DHM
 1992 – J. Haydn – Symphonies 88, 89, 92 – Virgin Classics
 1993 – J. Haydn – Symphonies 93, 94, 95 – BMG/DHM
 1993 – J. S. Bach – Brandenburg Concertos I–VI – BMG/DHM
 1993 – J. S. Bach – Motetten BWV 225–230
 1993 – W. A. Mozart – Così fan tutte (live recording)
 1994 – J. Haydn – Symphonies 96, 97, 98 – BMG/DHM
 1994 – J. S. Bach – Kantaten 49, 58, 82
 1995 – J. Haydn – Harmoniemesse/Te Deum – BMG/DHM
 1995 – J. Haydn – Symphonies 99, 100, 101 – BMG/DHM
 1996 – J. Haydn – Symphonies 102, 103, 104 – DHM
 1996 – W. A. Mozart – Don Giovanni (Live recording)
 1996 – W. A. Mozart – Sinfonia Concertante K. 364, Violin Concerto K. 216 – Denon
 1997 – G. B. Pergolesi – La Serva Padrona/Livieta e Tracollo
 1997 – J. Lully – Concert de Danse – Charpentier, Rebel
 1997 – W. A. Mozart – Violin Concerts K. 218–219 – Denon
 1998 – W. A. Mozart – Violin Concerts K. 207–211 Concertone K. 190 – Denon
 1999 – J. Haydn – Cello Concertos D major and C major – DHM
 1999 – W. A. Mozart – Le nozze di Figaro
 2000 – H. Schütz – Weihnachtshistorie – DHM
 2001 – J. S. Bach – Mass in B minor BWV 232 – Urtext
 2002 – J. S. Bach – Cantatas BWV 9, 94, 187 – Deutsche Harmonia Mundi (DHM)
 2002 – W. A. Mozart – Arias & Duets – DHM
 2003 – C. P. E. Bach – Die Auferstehung und Himmelfahrt Jesu – Hyperion
 2004 – J. G. Graun – Der Tod Jesu
 2004 – J. S. Bach – Motets BWV 225–229
 2005 – J. S. Bach – Cantatas Vol.1 BWV 98, 180, 56, 55
 2005 – W. A. Mozart – Die Zauberflöte
 2006 – J. S. Bach – Cantatas Vol. 2 BWV 177, 93, 135
 2006 – J. S. Bach – Cantatas Vol. 3 BWV 82, 178, 102
 2007 – W.A. Mozart – Cassations K. 63 – K. 99 and Divertimento K. 205
 2007 – J. S. Bach – Cantatas Vol. 4 BWV 16, 153, 65, 154
 2007 – J. S. Bach – Cantatas Vol. 5 BWV 179, 35, 164, 17
 2008 – C. Monteverdi – Vespro della Beata Vergine SV 206
 2008 – J. S. Bach – Cantatas Vol. 7 BWV 20, 2, 10
 2009 – J. S. Bach – Mass in B minor BWV 232
 2009 – J. S. Bach – Cantatas Vol. 8 BWV 13, 73, 81, 144
 2009 – J. S. Bach – Cantatas Vol. 9 BWV 61, 36, 62, 132
 2009 – J. S. Bach – Cantatas Vol. 10 BWV 108, 86, 11, 4
 2010 – J. S. Bach – Brandenburg Concertos BWV 1047–1051
 2010 – J. S. Bach – St Matthew Passion BWV 243
 2010 – J. S. Bach – Cantatas Vol. 11 BWV 67, 9, 12
 2010 – J. S. Bach – Cantatas Vol. 12 BWV 138, 27, 47, 99
 2011 – Vivaldi – Flute concertos
 2011 – J. S. Bach – Cantatas Vol. 13 BWV 249, 6
 2011 – J. S. Bach – Cantatas Vol. 14 BWV 91, 57, 151, 122
 2012 – D. Buxtehude – Membra Jesu Nostri BuxWV75
 2012 – J. S. Bach – St John Passion
 2012 – J. S. Bach – Cantatas Vol. 15 BWV 52, 60, 116, 140
 2012 – J. Haydn  – Die Tageszeiten: Symphonies Nos. 6, 7, 8 (Diapason d'or)

References

Sources

External links 
 
 La Petite Bande on bach-cantatas with photographs of the ensemble

Early music orchestras
Musical groups established in 1972
Belgian orchestras
1972 establishments in Belgium